Saul Kassin is a distinguished professor of psychology at John Jay College of Criminal Justice - City University of New York and Massachusetts Professor Emeritus of Psychology at Williams College in Williamstown, Massachusetts.

Biography and education 

Saul Kassin is an American social psychologist. Born in 1953, he was raised in Brooklyn, and then in Belle Harbor, New York. He attended Brooklyn College from 1971 to 1974 and graduated Phi Beta Kappa with a Bachelor of Science degree. While there, he  helped run experiments on implicit learning for cognitive psychologist and mentor Arthur S. Reber. From 1974 to 1978, he attended the University of Connecticut in Storrs, Connecticut, where he received his Ph.D. in personality and social psychology. While there, he studied attribution theory with his advisor Charles A. "Skip" Lowe. His dissertation was titled "Causal Attribution: A Perceptual Approach." With his doctoral degree he went on to begin his psychology and law career by studying jury decision making with Lawrence S. Wrightsman at the University of Kansas in Lawrence, Kansas. He then taught for two years taught at Purdue University in West Lafayette, Indiana, before starting at Williams College in 1981, where he spent most of his career. In 1984–85, while on sabbatical from Williams, Kassin was awarded a U.S. Supreme Court Judicial Fellowship and worked at the Federal Judicial Center in Washington, DC. In 1985–86, worked as a visiting professor and postdoctoral fellow in the Psychology and Law Program at Stanford University.

Career books, awards, research, and advocacy 

Over the years, Kassin has authored and edited several books, including: Psychology, Essentials of Psychology, Developmental Social Psychology (with Sharon S. Brehm and Frederick X. Gibbons), The Psychology of Evidence and Trial Procedure (with Lawrence S. Wrightsman), The American jury on trial: psychological perspectives (with Lawrence S. Wrightsman), and Confessions in the Courtroom (with Lawrence S. Wrightsman). He is also co-author of the textbook Social Psychology with Steven Fein and Hazel Rose Markus, now in its eleventh edition.

Kassin is a Fellow of the American Psychological Association (APA), the Association for Psychological Science (APS), and the American Psychology-Law Society (AP-LS). Although he has published research in the social psychology of attribution theory, jury decision-making, and eyewitness testimony, Kassin is best known for his groundbreaking work on false confessions. In 2007, he received a Presidential Award from the APA for this research. In 2011, he received the Lifetime Achievement Award from the International Investigative Interviewing Research Group (iiiRG). In 2014, he received an Award for Distinguished Contribution from AP-LS. In 2017, he received an Award for Lifetime Contribution from the European Association of Psychology and the Law (EAPL). In 2017, he also received the Award for Distinguished Contribution for Research on Public Policy from the APA. In 2021, he received the James McKeen Cattell Lifetime Achievement Award for Applied Research from the APS.

Kassin was the president of Division 41 of APA, a.k.a. AP-LS. He continues to teach, research, write, and lecture to judges, lawyers, law enforcement groups, psychologists, psychiatrists, and other high interest groups in the area of social psychology and the law. He has appeared as a guest analyst on all major TV networks and many syndicated news shows. He also appears in a number of podcasts, such as APA's "Speaking of Psychology: False confessions aren’t always what they seem", and documentaries such as the 2012 film by Ken Burns, Sarah Burns, and David McMahon titled The Central Park Five.  Determined to raise public awareness, Kassin has also written some high-profile opinion editorials and a provocative article on the false confessions that surrounded the infamous 1964 killing of Kitty Genovese.

A staunch critic of the Reid technique of interrogation, and in light of research showing that Miranda does not protect the innocent, Kassin is a vocal advocate for the requirement that all interrogations be videotaped in their entirety—without exception. Kassin is best known for pioneering the scientific study of false confessions. In 1985, he and Lawrence Wrightsman introduced a taxonomy that distinguished three types of false confessions—voluntary, compliant, and internalized. This classification scheme is universally accepted in the field.

Kassin also created the first laboratory research methods (the most notable being the computer crash experiment, used in forensic psychology to study the problems with certain types of police interrogation techniques and why innocent people confess. Along with fellow experts Steven Drizin, Thomas Grisso, Gisli Gudjonsson, Richard Leo, and Allison Redlich, he wrote a 2010 AP-LS White Paper called "Police-Induced Confessions: Risk Factors and Recommendations." To assess the consensus of opinions within the scientific community, he and his colleagues also recently published a survey of confession experts from all over the world. Over the years, Kassin has published many other empirical articles on the subject of confessions and has introduced such terms as positive coercion bias, minimization and maximization, guilt-presumptive interrogation, the phenomenology of innocence, and the forensic confirmation bias In recent articles, he explains why judges, juries, and others tend to believe false confessions even when contradicted eyewitnesses, alibis, DNA, and other evidence. In 2018, he and his colleagues published a survey of confession experts worldwide that indicated the consensus of opinions within the scientific community.
 
Kassin has long advocated for the mandatory video recording of suspect interviews and interrogations—in their entirety and without exception. With funding support from the National Science Foundation, he and his colleagues conducted a series of experiments on the effects of video recording on police, suspects, and lay fact finders, including the first fully randomized field experiment involving actual suspects. The results have all been published.

Kassin's work is cited all over the world, including by the U.S. Supreme Court and the Supreme Courts of Canada and Israel. He has worked on many high-profile cases and with the Innocence Project to use psychology to help prevent and correct wrongful convictions. He has testified as an expert witness in state, federal, and military courts. He was recently the subject of a feature article published in SCIENCE.

Published in June 2022, Kassin's newest book is titled DUPED: Why Innocent People Confess - And Why We Believe Their Confessions. Combining real cases and psychological research, this book describes how this unimaginable aspect of human behavior happens and then how false confessions corrupt forensics and other evidence, forces guilty pleas, blinds judges and juries, and stigmatizes defendants their entire lives—even after they are exonerated.

References

External links
Op-ed article 
Op-ed article 
Kassin biography
Professional Profile Kassin
Op-ed article
Kassin's White Paper on false confessions
Review on the psychology of confessions
Social psychological analysis of false confessions
Historical exploration into the 1964 killing of Kitty Genovese: What ELSE does this case tell us? 
CBS News: Do you know your MIRANDA rights?
Interview of Kassin at the Vera Institute of Justice
National Science Foundation Video (2016) - What Can We Do About False Confessions? 
Oprah Winfrey show on coerced confessions

1953 births
Living people
21st-century American psychologists
Brooklyn College alumni
University of Connecticut alumni
Fellows of the American Psychological Association
20th-century American psychologists